Osvaldo Roberto Rodríguez Flores (born 17 December 1990) is a Costa Rican footballer who plays as a right winger.

Club career
Rodríguez started his career at hometown club Santos de Guápiles and joined Alajuelense in 2014.

International career
Rodríguez made his debut for Costa Rica in a January 2013 Copa Centroamericana match against Belize and has, as of June 2014, earned a total of 11 caps, scoring no goals. He represented his country in 1 FIFA World Cup qualification match and he played at the 2013 Copa Centroamericana and the 2013 CONCACAF Gold Cup.

Honours
Costa Rica
Copa Centroamericana: 2013

References

External links
 
 Profile - Alajuelense
 

1990 births
Living people
People from Limón Province
Association football midfielders
Costa Rican footballers
Costa Rica international footballers
2013 Copa Centroamericana players
2013 CONCACAF Gold Cup players
2017 Copa Centroamericana players
Santos de Guápiles footballers
L.D. Alajuelense footballers
Copa Centroamericana-winning players
Liga FPD players